Seventh Fleet or 7th fleet may refer to:

 United States Seventh Fleet
 7th Fleet (Imperial Japanese Navy)

See also

Seventh (disambiguation)
Fleet (disambiguation)
Sixth Fleet (disambiguation)
Eighth Fleet (disambiguation)